Tidal Graves is a collaborative EP project from American rapper Khary and American record producer Lege Kale. It was released independently on July 28, 2017, by As We Arrive.

Background 
Tidal Graves features eight tracks. Khary is the main vocalist on every track, with Lege providing back up vocals and a guest verse on the last track "Desperado". All songs on the project were produced by Lege Kale. Additional production was added to a few songs by Mike Irish & West1ne. The photo used in the artwork was taken by Sergey Kolivayko, the creative director at Field Guide Co.

Release and promotion 
Tidal Graves was released on July 28, 2017, after a string of successful listening parties in Los Angeles and New York.

Singles 
On February 7, 2017, Khary debuted their first single "Stronger" from their project via The Fader. On March 10, 2017, Their Second Single, Too Fast, Was released by Lege. On July 21, 2017, The Music Video for "Too Fast" was premiered via Mass Appeal and revealed the cover art & official release date for the project. On July 26, 2017, Khary & Lege Premiered official annotated lyrics for their project with Genius.

Reception 
The project was met with critical acclaim from blogs and fans alike, gaining support from blogs such as HotNewHipHop, Revolt Tv, 2DopeBoyz, Okayplayer, Nest HQ, XXL & Genius. On August 17, Ebro Darden Presented "Fujiko" on his Beats 1 Radio Show

Track listing

Personnel 
 Khary - primary artist
 Lege Kale - producer, secondary artist, background vocals
 Mike Irish - engineering, mixing, mastering, additional production, background vocals
 West1ne - additional production

References 

2017 EPs
Hip hop EPs
EPs by American artists